The 2011–12 St. Lawrence Saints women's hockey team will represent St. Lawrence University in the 2011–12 NCAA Division I women's ice hockey season. The Saints are coached by Chris Wells and play their home games at Appleton Arena. The Saints are a member of the Eastern College Athletic Conference and will attempt to win the NCAA Women's Ice Hockey Championship

Offseason

Recruiting

Exhibition

Regular season

Standings

Schedule

Conference record

Postseason

NCAA tournament
March 10, 3-6 vs. Boston College

Awards and honors
Carmen MacDonald, ECAC Rookie of the Week (Week of January 24, 2012)
Rylee Smith, ECAC Player of the Week (Week of January 24, 2012)

References

St. Lawrence